The City of Bradford Metropolitan District Council elections took place on 3 May 2007.

Ward results
An asterisk denotes an incumbent

Baildon ward

Bingley ward

Bingley Rural ward

Bolton & Undercliffe ward

Bowling & Barkerend ward

Bradford Moor ward

City ward

Clayton & Fairweather Green ward

Craven ward

Eccleshill ward

Great Horton ward

Heaton ward

Idle & Thackley ward

Ilkley ward

Keighley Central ward
Labour incumbent Lynne Joyce was controversially dropped by the party for this election in favour of Mark Taylor.

Keighley East ward

Keighley West ward

Little Horton ward

Manningham ward

Queensbury ward

Royds ward

Shipley ward

Thornton & Allerton ward

Toller ward

Tong ward

Wharfedale ward

Wibsey ward

Windhill & Wrose ward

Worth Valley ward

Wyke ward

References

2007
Bradford
Bradford
2000s in West Yorkshire